The Siege of Novo Brdo is the successful attack of Mehmet the Conqueror on Novo Brdo in his second Serbian campaign in 1455

Siege 
Although the Sultan offered Isak Bey to surrender to the castle commander by sending him on the castle, the city was besieged when the castle commander did not accept it.

The Sultan blockaded the city and began to besiege it by setting up his cannons. When the Serbian ruler Brankovic heard of the siege, he did not know what to do and fortified all the other fortresses.

The siege lasted for 40 days throughout May and June, and the siege continued undisturbed by the Hungarians' threats.

After the siege 
In the surrender agreement, it was clearly stated that the inhabitants of the city could stay in the city, but this right was granted to the miners whose work was essential. The notables of the city were executed; 320 young men were recruited into the Janissaries. 700 Serbian women enlisted in the army. The roof of St. Nicholas Church, popularly known as the Saxon church, was removed and its bells were removed. In 1467, the rest of the people were taken to Istanbul. The Ottoman colony placed in the conquered city could not prevent the decline of the city. Novo Brdo, where an Ottoman mint was established, maintained its importance until the reign of Murad IV.

References 

Mehmed the Conqueror
Battles of Mehmed the Conqueror